The Lazarus Project (originally titled Extinction) is a Sky television science fiction action drama series from screenwriter Joe Barton and starring Paapa Essiedu. On 4 August 2022, it was announced that the series had been picked up for a second season.

Cast

Main

 Paapa Essiedu as George
 Anjli Mohindra as Archie
 Rudi Dharmalingam as Shiv
 Charly Clive as Sarah
 Caroline Quentin as Elisabeth 'Wes' Wesley
 Tom Burke as Rebrov

 Brian Gleeson as Ross
 Vinette Robinson as Janet
 Alec Utgoff as Rudy

Recurring
 Lorn Macdonald as Blake
 Lukas Loughran as Erik Eriksen 'The Dane'
 Salóme Gunnarsdóttir as Greta
 Enyi Okoronkwo as Laurence
 Tommy Letts as Ryan
 Chris Fulton as Karl

Synopsis
George (Essiedu) wakes up one morning and discovers the calendar has been rewound six months, but neither his girlfriend Sarah (Clive) or anyone else seems to notice. George has inadvertently stumbled across The Lazarus Project and he now lives in a world with continuous apocalyptic threat, and faces a life-changing dilemma.

Episodes

Production
Produced by Urban Myth Films, the series features Marco Kreuzpaintner, Akaash Meeda, and Laura Scrivano as directors. Filming took place in the spring of 2021 in Cardiff, Bristol, Prague, and Postoloprty. In February 2023 Empire had first look images from the filming of season two with Colin Salmon, Royce Pierreson, Safia Oakley-Green, Lorne MacFayden, Zoe Telford, Sam Troughton and James Atherton added to the cast.

Release
The first trailer was revealed in February 2022. After being retitled, The Lazarus Project aired in the UK on Sky Max and Now from 16 June 2022. In the United States, TNT picked up the series and it will premiere in early 2023.

Reception
The series has received positive reviews, for its storyline and performances. Lucy Mangan of The Guardian awarded it four stars out of five, praising the writing, tension created by the premise and cast. Nicole Vassell, writing for The Independent, gave it three stars, writing 'Though a little under-explained and occasionally simplistic, The Lazarus Project has a bright concept behind it with satisfying bursts of action'. The Telegraph gave it three stars.

See also
 List of films featuring time loops

References

External links

English-language television shows
Television shows shot in Bristol
2022 British television series debuts
2020s British drama television series
2020s British science fiction television series
British action television series
British time travel television series
British thriller television series
Sky UK original programming
Time loop television series